Masnières is a commune in the Nord department in northern France.

Heraldry

History
Masnières figured into the 1917 Battle of Cambrai during which time it was briefly captured by the British on the first day of the battle, November 20, and held for twelve days to protect vital bridgeheads between Masnières and Marcoing before the British withdrawal under the weight of heavy German counter-attack.

The actions of the battle are commemorated in and around Masnières by several Commonwealth War Graves Commission landmarks in and around the town, including:
Masnières Newfoundland Memorial
Masnières British Cemetery
Marcoing British Cemetery

See also
Communes of the Nord department
Marcel Gaumont. Sculpture on church

References

External links
 Aujourd'hui à Masnières (in French)

Communes of Nord (French department)